Planodes longemaculatus is a species of beetle in the family Cerambycidae. It was described by Stephan von Breuning in 1960, originally as Planodes  longemaculata. It is known from the Philippines.

References

longemaculatus
Beetles described in 1960